Kouri may refer to:

Wadi, dry watercourses
Donald Kouri, American physicist
Kouri, Bazèga, a place in Burkina Faso
Kouri, Gnagna, a place in Burkina Faso
 Kouri (Danzan-ryu Jujitsu Technique)
Kouri, the creator of the horror game Ib

See also
Khouri
Koury (disambiguation)
Cowry
Kauri (disambiguation)
Koure (disambiguation)
Kori (disambiguation)
Kowri, a village in Afghanistan
Kawri, a village in Syria
Karri
Kouri-Vini, Louisiana French-based creole language